Promise Land is a Christian symphonic metal band that originated in Pittsburgh, Pennsylvania and formed in 1997. It went on an unofficial hiatus around 2009. In 2010 there was a resurgence in the band.

Members
Current
 David Michael – Lead Guitars, Vocals, Keyboards (1997–present)
 Rod Kozikowski – Vocals, Rhythm Guitars (2010–present)
 Shawn Naeser – Drums (2013–present)

Session
 Eric Popp – Bass (1998-2000, 2013–present)

Former
 Alan Mosovsky – Drums (1999-2000)
 Alex Coyne – Rhythm Guitars, Backing Vocals (1997-2009)
 Gary Bova – Bass (2001-2013)
 Eric Bowser – Drums (2001-2013)

Timeline

Discography
EPs
 DRT (1997)
 Demo (2005)

Studio albums
 Harmony in Ruins (2014)

References

External links
 

 
Promise Land on XNilo Records

American Christian metal musical groups
Hard rock musical groups from Pennsylvania
Musical groups established in 1997